Pygopteryx is a genus of moths of the family Noctuidae.

Species
 Pygopteryx fulva Chang, 1991
 Pygopteryx suava Staudinger, 1887

References
Natural History Museum Lepidoptera genus database
Pygopteryx at funet

Hadeninae